The possession and acquisition licence (PAL) is the primary firearms licence under Canadian firearms laws. The PAL is the only licence issued to new adult firearms licence applicants in Canada; it is both required and the only permissible document for a person to acquire or permanently import a firearm. Applicants for a PAL must be 18 years of age or older. 

There is no requirement of citizenship or residency (although different forms, and slightly different requirements apply). A non-resident firearms declaration form that has been confirmed by a Canada Border Services Agency officer serves as a temporary firearms licence for non-residents that are visiting Canada for fewer than 60 days. Unlike a PAL, however, the non-resident firearms declaration is only considered a valid temporary licence for the specific firearms declared and does not permit the holder to borrow any firearms.

There is a separate licensing system to transport restricted firearms (authorization to transport). In other words, while a PAL (with appropriate endorsements) may permit a person to purchase a restricted firearm, it does not in itself permit that person to transport it from the store to their home. (This particular case can become an endorsement on a PAL.) For non-restricted firearms, separate authorization to transport is not required.

Other firearms licences 

Other firearm licences for individuals include:

Minors licence (under 18) permits borrowing a firearm. Usually applicant must be at least 12, although exceptions can be made if one can demonstrate "need". (Requirements, including courses, are substantially the same as PAL.)
Possession-only licences (POL), which no longer exist. All POLs were converted to PALs. The POL was a grandfathered class of licence that permitted possession of firearms and acquisition of ammunition, but not acquisition of firearms. 
Non-resident temporary borrowing licence for non-restricted firearms
Non-resident temporary possession licence for minors
Executor of will. While not technically a licence, the executor of a will, in many cases, can temporarily have custody of firearms as part of an estate, without themselves having a firearms licence.
NOTE: While issued licences read either "Possession • Acquisition" or "Possession Only", the Firearms Act, 1995 and regulations refer to either "possession and acquisition licence" or "possession licence", without the word only.

Obtaining/applying

All licensing of firearms in Canada is managed by the Canadian Firearms Program of the Royal Canadian Mounted Police. In the Canadian system, there are three classes of firearms and firearm licences: non-restricted, restricted and prohibited.

A possession and acquisition licence is a licence that allows individuals in Canada to possess and acquire firearms as well as ammunition. Licences are typically valid for five years and must be renewed prior to expiry to maintain all classes. If an individual possessing a PAL is convicted of certain offences, a PAL can be revoked. If an individual does not renew their PAL prior to its expiration date or if they have their PAL revoked, they must legally dispose of any firearms in their possession. A licence for prohibited firearms can be issued to qualifying businesses, and very rarely to individuals (firearms they own, as the gun laws changed over time.) Previous convictions for serious violent, drug or weapons offences almost invariably result in the denial of the application.

A PAL is generally obtained in the following three steps:
Safety training All PAL applicants are required to successfully complete the Canadian Firearms Safety Course (CFSC) for a Non-restricted licence, and the Canadian Restricted Firearms Safety Course (CRFSC) for a restricted licence. The examinations contain both a written and practical component. Information on the locations and availability of these courses can be found at the RCMP website.
 Formal application Submit completed application (with supporting documents)
Security screening Background checks and investigations are performed. All applicants are screened and a mandatory 28-day waiting period is imposed on first-time applicants.

Licences are typically valid for five years and must be renewed prior to expiry to maintain all classes. Once licensed, an individual can apply for a firearm transfer; and an authorization to transport (ATT) for restricted firearms.

Classification of firearms
Like licences, firearms are classified into prohibited, restricted and non-restricted categories.

History
PALs were introduced in Canada in 1995 as part of Bill C-68 as a replacement for the FAC (firearms acquisition certificate) system. Whereas the FAC was only required to acquire a firearm, a PAL is required to both acquire and possess firearms and to acquire ammunition. A PAL for non-restricted firearms allows its holders to acquire and possess any non-restricted firearm, while a PAL for restricted firearms (which also covers prohibited firearms to those eligible) allows the holder to acquire and possess restricted firearms.

When first implemented, the PAL also allowed the holder to acquire a cross-bow, although no licence was required to possess one. There is no longer a licensing requirement for purchasing cross-bows.

Transportation of firearms
The transportation regulations are broken down into two divisions: those for non-restricted firearms and those for restricted or prohibited firearms. These rules are laid out in the Storage, Display, Transportation and Handling of Firearms by Individuals Regulations.
A non restricted firearm may be transported so long as it is unloaded. Such a firearm does not need to be encased or trigger locked.

A restricted firearm must be disabled by use of a trigger, cable, or other locking device and locked in an opaque case.
An unattended non-restricted firearm left in a vehicle must be locked in the trunk or other compartment, if one is available. In order to transport restricted or prohibited firearms, an individual must obtain an authorization to transport. An ATT is generally approved only for individuals to transport a restricted or prohibited firearm to a shooting range for target practice, gun show for sale, to a gunsmith or gun shop or for a competition (e.g.: IPSC).

An authorization to carry (ATC) allows a person to carry a restricted firearm or prohibited handgun concealed (if specified as a condition of carry) and loaded. An ATC for open carry is usually only issued to employees of armoured car companies or for other limited employment reasons. In very rare situations, an ATC may be issued for protection of life, which would allow the holder to have a loaded handgun with them, or at home, without violating safe storage rules that usually require an unloaded firearm to be trigger locked and secured.

See also
Canadian Firearms Registry
Dominion of Canada Rifle Association
Firearms regulation in Canada

References

External links
Canadian Firearms Program Website

Canadian firearms law
1995 establishments in Canada
Licenses
Identity documents of Canada
Royal Canadian Mounted Police